Anker (cognate Ancher) is a given name of Danish, Faroese and Norwegian origin, sometimes used as a surname. Notable people with the name include:

People with the given name
Ancher Nelsen (1904–1992), American politician
Anker Boye (born 1950),  Danish politician
Anker Engelund (1889–1961),  Danish civil engineer
Anker Jørgensen (1922–2016), Danish politician
Anker Eli Petersen (born 1959),  Faroese writer and artist
Anker Rogstad (1925–1994), Norwegian criminal and writer
Anker Smith (1759–1819), English engraver

People with the surname
Anna Ancher (1859–1935), Danish painter
Albert Anker (1831–1910), Swiss painter
Bernt Anker (1746–1805), Norwegian merchant, chamberlain and playwright
Bernt Theodor Anker (1867–1943), Norwegian linguist, priest and author
Carsten Anker (1747–1824), Norwegian politician
Christian Anker (businessman) (1917–1988), Norwegian businessman
Christian August Anker (1840–1912), Norwegian businessman
Christian August Anker (1896–1982) (1896–1982), Norwegian businessman
Conrad Anker (born 1962), American rock climber
Ed Anker (born 1978), Dutch politician
Ella Anker (1870–1958), Norwegian journalist
Erik Anker (1903–1994), Norwegian olympic sailor
Ferdinand Anker (1876–1954), Norwegian businessman
Helen Anker (born 1972), English actress
Herman Anker (1839–1896), Norwegian educationalist
Irving Anker (1911–2000), American educator
Johan Anker (1871–1940), Norwegian olympic sailor
Johan Peter Andreas Anker (1838–1876), Danish military officer
Kristian Anker (1848–1928), Danish Lutheran minister
Lotte Anker (born 1958), Danish saxophone player
Michael Ancher (1849–1927), Danish painter
Nils Anker (1836–1893), Norwegian politician
Nini Roll Anker (1873–1942), Norwegian novelist and playwright
Peder Anker (1749–1824), Norwegian politician
Peder Anker (historian) (born 1966), Norwegian historian
Peter Anker (1744–1832), Norwegian diplomat and colonialist
Peter Anker (art historian) (1927–2012), Norwegian art historian
Peter Martin Anker (diplomat) (1903–1977), Norwegian diplomat
Peter Martin Anker (politician) (1801–1863), Norwegian politician
Matthias Joseph Anker (1771–1843), Austrian geologist
Robert Anker (1946–2017), Dutch writer
Øyvind Anker (1904–1989), Norwegian librarian

See also
Poul Anker Bech (1942–2009), Danish painter
Anker (noble family)
Ankers
Anker (disambiguation)

Danish masculine given names
Faroese masculine given names
Norwegian masculine given names
Norwegian-language surnames